This is a list of equipment used by the Philippine Army, the branch of the Armed Forces of the Philippines that specializes in ground warfare. The service has made use of its existing equipment to fulfill its mandate while modernization projects are underway. The Republic Act No. 7898 declares the policy of the State to modernize the military to a level where it can effectively and fully perform its constitutional mandate to uphold the sovereignty and preserve the patrimony of the republic. The law, as amended, has set conditions that should be satisfied when the defense department procures major equipment and weapon systems for the army.

Armored vehicles

Combat support equipment

Utility vehicles

Artillery

Aircraft

Watercrafts

Infantry weapons

Anti-tank

Communication equipment

Night-vision equipment

Acquisition programs

The Philippine Army has embarked on a 3-phase modernization program starting from 2013 to 2028 under the Revised AFP Modernization Program (RAFPMP) covered by Republic Act 10349, while still completing a previous modernization program spanning from 1995 to 2012 under the AFP Modernization Program (AFPMP) covered by Republic Act 7898. Several new acquisitions found in the current inventory were acquired under the AFP Modernization Program, as the Army projects under the RAFPMP are yet to be implemented as of September 2015.

Light Tanks
To provide a starting point for the Philippine Army's goal of re-establishing its lost armored / tank capabilities, the Armor Division has proposed the acquisition of Light or Medium Tanks to enable them to re-learn the operation and use of tanks in different combat situations. They originally requested 144 Light Tanks for the Horizon 2 phase of AFP Modernization.

Elbit Systems won the Light Tank Acquisition Project, with the Notice of Award (NOA) issued by the Department of National Defense in September 2020. The Army will receive Sabrah Light Tanks consisting of 18 tracked version and 10 wheeled version. These will be armed with a new 105 mm gun developed by Elbit in partnership with Denel Land Systems. Also included in the package is 1 tracked armored command vehicle and 1 tracked armored recovery vehicle.

APC Acquisition and Upgrade Program
The Philippine Army has been considering the upgrade of several dozens of Simba and V-150 4x4 armored vehicles. However, due to budget difficulties, it has to choose which projects to prioritize. To improve the mobility of the Armor Division, as well as introduce a new model to complement and eventually replace ageing assets, the Philippine Army submitted a request for the acquisition of a new fleet of wheeled Armoured Personnel Carriers (APC). They originally requested 114 APCs for the Horizon 2 phase of AFP Modernization.

In October 2020, the Notice of Award for the Wheeled Armored Personnel Carrier Acquisition Project was issued to Elbit Systems which offered 28 units of IVECO Guarani 6x6 armored vehicle.

There was a previous report from Thailand where in it was mentioned that the Thai government is nearing a G2G agreement with the Philippines to supply 200 units of First Win 2 4x4 wheeled armored vehicle to the Philippine Army to resist any ambush mostly landmines.

Armored Vehicle-Launched Bridge
The Philippine Army awarded Elbit Systems for the acquisition of the M1074 Joint Assault Bridge.  The contract signing was expected at the 1st quarter of 2020. Two units of AVLBs based on the Merkava IV chassis were delivered in July 2022.

Land-Based Missile System
The Philippine Army is in the process of acquiring its first long range missile systems to allow it to engage targets beyond the country's shore against enemy warships, or depending on the missiles available, to strike land targets. Its objective is to provide the Philippine Army a long range tactical capability to defend the country from foreign naval threats especially those directly threatening the Philippine mainland. The missile system will be operated by the Army Artillery Regiment.

The Land Based Missile System (LBMS) Acquisition Project is a Horizon 2 phase Priority Project under the Revised AFP Modernization Program. It is the successor to the cancelled Shore Based Missile System (SBMS) Acquisition Project back in 2015.

In 2018, the plan was part of the PHP 300 billion/USD $5.6 billion Horizon 2 phase projects, with the budget for the Land-Based Missile System approved by President Duterte in June 2018. The BrahMos Missile Systems from India being the main contender for the project where at least 2 batteries set to be acquired. The project was delayed due to the pandemic.

Multiple Launch Rocket System
South Korea donated four batteries of retired K136 Kooryong multiple launch rocket system (MLRS), related equipment and ammunitions to the AFP. Of the four batteries, three would go to the Philippine Army. One battery can consist of between four and six firing units. The delay is due to the non-released for funds for its shipment from South Korea to the Philippines.

Aircraft
In October 2019, the Philippine Army activated its aviation regiment. In addition, the Philippine Army is planning to buy helicopters in the next few years to be used by its sole flying unit, which currently has fixed-wing aircraft for special aviation missions. The United States will be turning over rotary and fixed-wing aircraft to the Philippine Army as the ground forces intensify counterinsurgency operations to end the Maoist-led rebellion before the term of President Duterte ends in 2022. Washington has offered four UH-60 Black Hawk combat utility helicopters, four Bell AH-1 SuperCobra attack helicopters and five twin-engine, turbo-prop C-12 Huron planes for troop transport and medical evacuation. The Army is also in talks with Boeing Rotorcraft Systems for the possible acquisition of the Boeing AH-6I light attack helicopters.

Infantry and Crew-served Weapons
In line with the Philippine Army's requirement to acquire additional rifles to meet its growing needs, the branch of service conducted the acquisition of additional 2,702 new rifles in 5.56x45mm NATO caliber under the Assault Rifle M4/AR15 Platform Acquisition Project in which deliveries started in October 2019 and would end in February 2020.

The Government Arsenal is being tapped to refurbish or rebuild a majority of the Army's M16A1 rifles, and prototypes were already made to convert them to several variants.

Aside from the M16A1, the Government Arsenal will also be refurbishing or rebuilding the existing M14 battle rifles of the AFP, into either the M14 SOCOM 16 battle rifle similar to the Springfield Armory M1A SOCOM 16 rifle, the M14 Designated Marksman Rifle (DMR) which similar to the US Marine Corps' Designated Marksman Rifle; and to the Enhanced Battle Rifle (EBR) which is similar to the US Navy's Mk 14 Enhanced Battle Rifle.

Short Ranged Air-Defense (SHORAD) Systems
Aside from the current M39 cannons and other AA guns used by field units, the Army has MANPADS in its inventory including the MBDA Mistral and FIM-92 Stinger in limited numbers which operated by the Presidential Security Group. With the activation of 1st and 2nd Air Defense Artillery Battery in 2019 and 2020 respectively, the Army is preparing to acquire Man-Portable Air-Defense Systems (MANPADS), as part of the Horizon 2 projects. They are eyeing the MBDA Mistral system from France, and the LIG Nex1 Chiron system from South Korea.

Communications Equipment
The DND awarded an US$18 million contract to Harris Corporation to supply Harris Falcon III tactical vehicular radios and intercom systems for the Philippine Army's Mechanized Infantry Division (formerly the Light Armor Division). The contract required RF-7800V Combat Net Radios and RF-7800I Intercom Systems to be installed of the MID's armored and support vehicles.

The Philippine Army also acquired additional Falcon-series tactical radios from Harris under a FMS deal with the US government, with a requirement for 62 100W base radios, 520 20W man-pack radios, and 1,376 5W hand-held radios under the AFPMP RA 7898 already awarded in 2014. Another set of orders was slated under RAFPMP RA 10349, with an additional 60 units 50W HF vehicular radios and 1,446 5W hand-held radios.

See also

 List of equipment of the Philippine Air Force
 List of equipment of the Philippine Navy
 List of equipment of the Philippine Marine Corps

References

Bibliography

 

Military equipment of the Philippines
Philippines
Philippine Army
Weapons of the Philippine Army
Vehicles of the Philippine Army
Equipment